Lawra is a small town and is the capital of Lawra district, a district in the Upper West Region of  Ghana.

Location 
The town is located in the North western part of Ghana. Its distance from Wa, the Regional capital by road is 88.55 Kilometers (55.02 miles).

History
The town was an administrative centre for the historic British empire. The ruins of a large mansion from the empire still, rather incongruously, remain.

Politics 
Lawra is in the Lawra constituency headed by Hon. Anthony Nyoh-Abeyifaa Karbo of the New Patriotic Party. He succeeded   Hon. Samson Abu of the National Democratic congress.

Tourism
Lawra is known for its musical instrument manufacture, and for the Kobine harvest festival with important dancing and musical events.

References

External links
 Lawra District

Populated places in the Upper West Region